The first edition of the Champs-Élysées Film Festival was held from 6 to 12 June 2012, with actors Lambert Wilson and Michael Madsen presiding. During the first edition, more than 15,000 people attended, with more than 50 films screened. Besides the Official Selection of American Independent Films, the Festival's main event, three other non-competitive selections were presented: French Galas, American Galas and Oscar Nominated Foreign Language Films. A competitive Official Shorts Selection was also showcased. A tribute to Harvey Weinstein was held to celebrate his career and a retrospective of 11 of his films was shown throughout the week. Three Audience Prizes (Best American Feature-Length Film, Best American Short Film, Best French Short Film) were presented during the Closing Ceremony, held at the Publicis Cinema.

Official Selection

American Independent Feature-Length Films

 Jesus Henry Christ, directed by Dennis Lee
 Blank City, directed by Céline Danhier
 Peace, Love & Misunderstanding, directed by Bruce Beresford
 Bernie, directed by Richard Linklater
 Tabloïd, directed by Errol Morris
 The Perfect Family, directed by Anne Renton
 Keep the Lights On, directed by Ira Sachs
 LUV directed by Sheldon Candis
 Marina Abramovic: The Artist Is Present, directed by Matthew Akers
 Not Waving But Drowning, directed by Devyn Waitt

Short films

The Official Selection of Short Films comprises more than 30 films, which were selected by a French industry team as well as four major film school programs: University of Southern California's School of Cinematic Arts, New York University's Tisch School of the Arts and Columbia University's Columbia University Film Festival for the United States and Paris-based film school La Femis for France.

French Shorts Competitive Selection

French Shorts Selection
 Hurlement d'un Poisson, directed by Sébastien Carfora
 It's a Miracul’house, directed by Stéphane Freiss
 Les Meutes, directed by Manuel Schapira
 Mon Canard, directed by Emmanuelle Michelet & Vincent Fouquet
 Les Grossesses de Charlemagne, directed by Nicolas Slomka & Matthieu Rumani
 Plume, directed by Barry Purves
 Personne(s), directed by Marc Fouchard
 La Fille de l'Homme, directed by Manuel Schapira
 Kiss & Kill, directed by Alain Ross

La Femis Shorts Selection
 Goose, directed by Morgan Simon
 Demain Ce Sera Bien, directed by Pauline Gay
 On Tracks, directed by Laurent Navarri
 Bye Bye Wild Boy, directed by Julie Lena

American Shorts Competitive Selection

USC School of Cinematic Arts Shorts Selection
 Little Spoon, directed by Lauren Fash
 Ellen, directed by Kyle Hausmann-Stokes
 Efrain, directed by Matthew Breault
 Fig, directed by Ryan Coogler
 The Nature of Fall, directed by Tomer Stolz

New York University Tisch School of the Arts Shorts Selection
 Little Horse, directed by Levi Abrino
 Border Land, directed by Alexander Smolowe
 Premature, directed by Rashaad Ernesto Green
 Down in Number 5, directed by Kim Spurlock

Columbia University Film Festival Shorts Selection
 Rolling on the Floor Laughing, directed by Rusel Harbaugh
 Motherland, directed by Shario Siddiqui
 Hatch, directed by Christoph Kusching
 Crossing, directed by Gina Atwater
 Off Season, directed by Jonathan Van Tulleken
 The Hirosaki Players, directed by Jeff Sousa

US in Progress Official Selection
 A Teacher, directed by Hannah Fidell
 I am I directed by Jocelyn Towne
 House of Last Things directed by Michael Bartlett
 Desert Cathedral, directed by Travis Gutiérrez Senger

Awards
Audience Prizes
 Best American Independent Film: Marina Abramovic: The Artist Is Present, directed by Matthew Akers
 Best American Short Film: Motherland, directed by Shariq Siddiqui
 Best French Short Film: It's Miracul'house, directed by Stéphane Freiss

US in Progress
 US in Progress Paris Award: A Teacher, directed by Hannah Fidell
 Special Mention: I am I directed by Jocelyn Towne

Festival theaters
 Le Balzac
 Gaumont Champs-Elysées
 Le Lincoln
 Publicis Cinéma
 UGC George V

See also

References

External links 
 
 
 

Champs-Élysées Film Festival
2012 in Paris
2012 in French cinema
2012 film festivals
2012 festivals in Europe